Levels of Life is a 2013 memoir by English author Julian Barnes, dedicated to his wife Pat Kavanagh, a literary agent who died in 2008.

The book comprises three essays:
The Sin of Height: The first essay explores Anglo-French ballooning in the 19th-century, concentrating on photographer and inventor Gaspard-Félix Tournachon, later known simply as Nadar, who combined photography and aeronautics as the first aerial photographer. Also appearing are English colonel and pioneer balloonist Fred Burnaby and Sarah Bernhardt, who was photographed several times by Nadar.
On the Level: Here Barnes fictionalizes the relationship between Burnaby and Bernhardt.
The Loss of Depth: Barnes contemplates his wife's no longer being there: "the fact that someone is dead may mean that they are not alive, but doesn't mean that they do not exist."

Reception
Leyla Sanai in The Independent's writes "Levels of Life uses the pioneering of balloon flight and the development of aerial photography as metaphors for the soaring heights, freedom, and imprinting of memories, of love. But there is no disguising the raw pain that pulses throughout; the solitary heartbeat of the one left behind..."Every love story is a potential grief story," writes Barnes early on. Anyone who has loved and lost can't fail to be moved by this devastating book.'
Blake Morrison in The Guardian explains 'One by one, the classic consolations offered to the bereaved are considered and repudiated: that suffering makes you stronger; that things get easier after the first year, through repetition ("why should repetition mean less pain?"); that the two of you will be reunited in the next life (which no atheist can believe). He owns up to thoughts of suicide and explains the reason for resisting: he is his wife's chief rememberer, and if he kills himself he will be killing her too...Denying himself woolly comforts, Barnes scorns the euphemisms of "passed" or "lost to cancer". Even actions that others might find strange – his habit of talking to his wife, though she is dead – have their own irresistible logic: "the fact that someone is dead may mean that they are not alive, but doesn't mean that they do not exist...Its resonance comes from all it doesn't say, as well as what it does; from the depth of love we infer from the desert of grief.'
Sarah Manguso concludes in the New York Times that 'Memoir is often accused of being the most indulgent literary genre, and the first two essays, intellectually and imaginatively rigorous, provide a kind of apology for the third. But despite all expectations, those two are the ones that occasionally wax sentimental; the dialogue between Burnaby and Bernhardt can blush somewhat purple. In the third essay, Barnes refers to the dangerous lure of grief's “self-pity, isolationism, world-scorn, an egotistical exceptionalism: all aspects of vanity.” His articulation of his anguish is well served by his leeriness, as the book's last section is one of the least indulgent accounts of mourning I have ever read. I almost wish “Levels of Life” consisted only of its 56 shattering pages.'
In NPR, Heller McAlpin states 'Among the many trenchant questions Barnes poses in Levels of Life is what constitutes success in mourning: "Does it lie in remembering or in forgetting?" He contemplates suicide, but is stayed by the realization that his wife lives through his memories. Yet, "You ask yourself: what happiness is there in just the memory of happiness?"
Sam Leith in The Spectator explains that 'So this is an odd memoir: it is emotionally self-exposing (there'll be no shortage of ‘searingly honest’ quotes to put on the paperback) but on another level very private. You learn almost nothing from it about Pat (she's not even named in the text), or about their relationship. The book is not an attempt to bring her to life. It describes and enacts her absence. It is the more piercing for Barnes's refusal to sentimentalise himself or others. He levelly reports what he felt, how he thought, what he feels now, what he thinks now. He doesn't prettify things to spare feelings.' and concludes 'For all Barnes's tools of detachment and self-analysis, this is a force-ten account of the ongoing pain of having loved entirely and lost entirely. It reads like what it is: a book with its heart missing.'

References

2013 non-fiction books
Works by Julian Barnes
Jonathan Cape books
British memoirs